Fontevivo is a comune (municipality) in the Province of Parma in the Italian region Emilia-Romagna, located about  northwest of Bologna and about  northwest of Parma.

It is best known as the location of the former Fontevivo Abbey, the church of which now serves as the parish church.

The municipality of Fontevivo contains the frazioni (subdivisions, mainly villages and hamlets) Bellena, Bianconese, Case Cantarana, Case Gaiffa, Case Massi, Fienilnuovo, Fondo Fontana, Fontane, Molinetto, Ponte Recchio, Ponte Taro, Recchio di Sotto, Romitaggio, Stazione Castelguelfo, Tarona, and Torchio.

Fontevivo borders the following municipalities: Fontanellato, Noceto, Parma.

Demographic evolution

References

External links
 www.comune.fontevivo.pr.it

Cities and towns in Emilia-Romagna